The 1977 Independence Bowl featured the Louisville Cardinals and the Southland Conference champion Louisiana Tech Bulldogs. Louisville struck first on a 60-yard punt return for a touchdown by Kevin Miller in the first quarter. Louisiana Tech answered with a 1-yard touchdown run by Lewis to tie the game. The Bulldogs scored another touchdown on a 41-yard Keith Thibodeaux pass to Pree. Still in the first quarter, Thibodeaux threw an 8-yard touchdown pass to McCartney to increase Louisiana Tech's lead to 21–7. In the second quarter, Swiley connected on a 21-yard field goal to give the Dawgs a 24-7 halftime lead. In the third quarter, Kevin Miller scored his second touchdown of the game on a 13-yard run to close the gap to 24–14, which would end up being the final score.

Game summary

Scoring summary

Statistics

References

Independence Bowl, 1977
Independence Bowl
Louisville Cardinals football bowl games
Louisiana Tech Bulldogs football bowl games
Independence Bowl
December 1977 sports events in the United States